The Terpensmole is a drainage mill in IJlst (West Frisian: Drylts), Friesland, Netherlands. It was moved from its earlier location in Sneek in 2011 where it was known as the Himmole. The mill is listed as a Rijksmonument, number 22914. It is fully functional and can be used to help drain the adjacent polder.

History
The original windmill was built in the eighteenth century and located near Grou and called Minne Finne. The mill was moved to Sneek in 1982 and renamed Himmole, though the Minne Finne was in such a bad state of repair that its relocation was in fact a reconstruction with no or very few parts of the original windmill being reused. The new mill was also quite a bit larger than the old mill. The mill was built here as compensation for the loss of the windmill 't Op of Oppenhuizen (part of Sneek) that was moved to Koudum. The new location near Sneek deteriorated from growing trees, nearby buildings and a new road. In 2011 the windmill was moved again, this time to IJlst, only 300 metres from timber windmill De Rat. This is the location where the first Terpensmole was built some time before 1832 and stood into the twentieth century, so the moved mill has been given this historic name.

Description

The Terpensmole is what the Dutch describe as a "spinnenkop". It is a small hollow post mill winded by a winch.

Public access
The mill is situated right next to a bicycle path and open to the public by appointment.

References

Windmills in Friesland
Hollow post mills in the Netherlands
Rijksmonuments in Friesland
Windmills completed in 2011
Windpumps in the Netherlands
Agricultural buildings in the Netherlands